The Liberty Theatre is a former Broadway theatre in New York City.

Liberty Theater or Liberty Theatre can also refer to:

In the United States
Liberty Theater (Astoria, Oregon)
Liberty Theatre (Camas, Washington)
Liberty Theater (Columbus, Georgia), listed on the National Register of Historic Places
Liberty Theatre (Eunice, Louisiana), listed on the National Register of Historic Places
Liberty Theater (La Grande, Oregon)
Liberty Theater (Murphysboro, Illinois)
Liberty Theatre (New Orleans), a now-demolished theatre, located on St. Charles Avenue, part of a site now occupied by the Pan American Life Center
Liberty Theatre (San Jose, California), originally located on Market Street, demolished in late 1982
Liberty Theater (Walla Walla, Washington), listed on the National Register of Historic Places
Liberty Theatre (Youngstown, Ohio)
Teatro Liberty, Quebradillas, Puerto Rico, listed on the National Register of Historic Places

In Canada
Liberty Theatre, in Toronto, also known as the Standard Theatre (Toronto), is said to have been the only purpose-built Yiddish theatre

Lists of theatres